4029 Bridges, provisional designation , is a stony asteroid and binary system from the middle regions of the asteroid belt, approximately 8 kilometers in diameter.

It was discovered on 24 May 1982, by American astronomers Carolyn Shoemaker and Schelte Bus at Palomar Observatory, California, and named after American USGS planetary cartographer Patricia M. Bridges.

Orbit and classification 

Bridges is a stony S-type asteroid that orbits the Sun in the middle main-belt at a distance of 2.2–2.9 AU once every 4.01 years (1,466 days). Its orbit has an eccentricity of 0.13 and an inclination of 5° with respect to the ecliptic. With a semi-major axis of 2.525 AU, Bridges is near the main-belt's Kirkwood gap at 2.5 AU, which corresponds to the 3:1 orbital resonance with the gas giant Jupiter. It is, however, not a member of the Alinda family due to its much lower eccentricity.

Physical characteristics

Primary

Rotation period 

In May 2002, a first rotational lightcurve of Bridges was obtained from photometric observations by French amateur astronomers René Roy and Laurent Bernasconi. Lightcurve analysis gave a well-defined rotation period of 3.6941 hours with a brightness variation of 0.24 magnitude.

A large number of observations have followed since 2006, when a satellite in orbit of Bridges was discovered (see below). Between 2007 and 2012, several observation by astronomers Petr Pravec and gave a period between 3.57459 and 3.5754 hours with an amplitude between 0.18 and 0.29 magnitude.

Diameter and albedo 

According to the survey carried out by NASA's Wide-field Infrared Survey Explorer (WISE) with its subsequent NEOWISE mission, Bridges measures 7.433 and 8.015 kilometers in diameter and its surface has an albedo of 0.265 and 0.2007, respectively. The Collaborative Asteroid Lightcurve Link adopts Petr Pravec's revised WISE-data, that is, an albedo of 0.1848 and a diameter of 7.91 kilometers with an absolute magnitude of 12.96.

Satellite 

In April and May 2006, Bridges was observed by astronomers David Higgins at Hunters Hill Observatory, Australia, Petr Pravec and Peter Kušnirák at Ondřejov Observatory Czech Republic, Walter R. Cooney Jr., John Gross and Dirk Terrell at Sonoita Research Observatory, United States, and Robert Stephens at Santana Observatory , United States.

The observed mutual occultation/eclipsing events revealed, that Bridges is a binary asteroid, that is orbited every  hours by a minor-planet moon. A refined orbital period of 16.317 hours was later published. Johnston's Archive also estimates a semi-major axis of 13 kilometers for the moon's orbit.

Naming 

This minor planet was named after Patricia M. Bridges, planetary cartographer with the United States Geological Survey. Bridges has created detailed maps of several planetary body's surface features, and has been an airbrushing expert for shaded lunar relief maps based on spacecraft images. The approved naming citation was published by the Minor Planet Center on 12 December 1989.

Notes

References

External links 
 Asteroids with Satellites, Robert Johnston, johnstonsarchive.net
 Ondrejov Asteroid Photometry Project, project website
 Asteroid Lightcurve Database (LCDB), query form (info )
 Dictionary of Minor Planet Names, Google books
 Asteroids and comets rotation curves, CdR – Observatoire de Genève, Raoul Behrend
 Discovery Circumstances: Numbered Minor Planets (1)-(5000) – Minor Planet Center
 
 

004029
Discoveries by Carolyn S. Shoemaker
Discoveries by Schelte J. Bus
Named minor planets
004029
19820524